Dolgoma is a genus of moths in the family Erebidae. The genus was erected by Frederic Moore in 1878.

Most species were previously placed in the genus Eilema.

Species
 Dolgoma angulifera (Felder, 1868) (India, Thailand)
 Dolgoma cribrata (Staudinger, 1887) (eastern Asia)
Dolgoma diktyo Volynkin & Černý, 2021
 Dolgoma fukienica (Daniel, 1954) (south-eastern China)
Dolgoma kawila Volynkin & Černý, 2021
Dolgoma khelanga Volynkin & Černý, 2021
Dolgoma locus (Bucsek, 2012)
 Dolgoma lucida (Fang, 2000) (south-western China)
 Dolgoma nigrocribrata Dubatolov, Kishida & M. Wang, 2012
 Dolgoma oblitterans (Felder, 1868) (Himalayas to Yunnan)
 Dolgoma ovalis Fang, 2000 (China: Shaanxi)
 Dolgoma recta Černý, 2009 (Thailand)
 Dolgoma reticulata Moore, 1878 (Himalayas)
 Dolgoma rectoides Dubatolov, 2012
Dolgoma steineri (Holloway, 2001)
 Dolgoma striata Dubatolov, 2012
 Dolgoma striola Dubatolov, Kishida & M. Wang, 2012
 Dolgoma xanthocraspis (Hampson, 1900) (eastern India, southern and central China)
Dolgoma xanthoma Singh, Kirti, Datta & Volynkin, 2019

Selected former species
 Dolgoma klapperichi is now Wittia klapperichi (Daniel, 1954) (southern China)
 Dolgoma perdentata is now Teulisna perdentata (H. Druce, 1899) (south-western China, Malakka)

References

Notes
 
 , 2012: Dolgoma striola sp. nov. a new species of lichen moths from the Nanling mountains (Guangdong, China) (Lepidoptera, Arctiidae: Lithosiinae). Amurian Zoological Journal 4 (3): 274–276. Full article: .
 

 
Lithosiina
Moth genera